Lithium hexafluorogermanate is the inorganic compound with the formula Li2GeF6.  It forms a solid off-white deliquescent powder. When exposed to moisture, it easily hydrolyses to release hydrogen fluoride and germanium tetrafluoride gases.

Reactions and applications
Lithium hexafluorogermanate can be dissolved in a solution of hydrogen fluoride, which forms a precipitate of lithium fluoride.

It can be used as a densification aid in the sintering of gadolinium oxysulfide, and as a lithium salt additive in a lithium-ion battery electrolyte.

References

Lithium salts
Fluorometallates
Germanium(IV) compounds